The 2017 VFL Women's season was the second season of the VFL Women's (VFLW). The season commenced on 6 May and concluded with the Grand Final on 24 September 2017. 

The competition was contested by ten clubs with two changes from the inaugural season – Knox were replaced by the Box Hill Hawks (operated by the Hawthorn Football Club); and Geelong Magpies were replaced by the Geelong Cats.

Clubs

Ladder

Finals series

Semi-finals

Preliminary final

Grand Final

Awards
 Lambert-Pearce Medal (Best and Fairest): Katie Brennan (Darebin)
 Rohenna Young Medal (Leading Goal kicker): Katie Brennan (Darebin) & Chloe Molloy (Diamond Creek) – 32 goals
 Debbie Lee Medal (Rising Star): Chloe Molloy (Diamond Creek)
 Coach of the Year: Paul Hood (Geelong)
 Lisa Hardeman Medal (Best on ground VFL Women's Grand Final): Karen Paxman (Darebin)

References